Ancestors is an album by Canadian jazz pianist  Renee Rosnes, which was released in 1996 by Blue Note Records. It won the 1997 Juno Award for Best Mainstream Jazz Album.

Personnel 
Renee Rosnes – piano
Chris Potter – tenor & soprano sax
Nicholas Payton – trumpet
Peter Washington – bass
Al Foster – drums
Don Alias – percussion

References 

1996 albums
Juno Award for Best Jazz Album albums
Renee Rosnes albums